The TEG-15 is a model of light rail vehicle manufactured by Bombardier Transportation for the Guadalajara light rail system.  Twelve other firms competed for the Guadalajara contract.  The contract was awarded in late 2015, and was completed in approximately two years.

Design
The vehicles were designed with seats for 40 passengers, and a maximum capacity of 250 individuals.

Operational history
The first two vehicle set was delivered in March 2017.  The final of the twelve was delivered in early November 2017.

References

Bombardier Transportation multiple units
Light rail vehicles
Guadalajara light rail system
750 V DC multiple units
Rolling stock of Mexico